Zygodon is a genus of moss in family Orthotrichaceae.

Species
 Zygodon gracilis

References

Moss genera
Orthotrichales
Taxa named by Thomas Taylor (botanist)